The 1988 Pacific typhoon season had no official bounds; it ran year-round in 1988, but most tropical cyclones tend to form in the northwestern Pacific Ocean between May and November. These dates conventionally delimit the period of each year when most tropical cyclones form in the northwestern Pacific Ocean. Tropical Storms formed in the entire west Pacific basin were assigned a name by the Joint Typhoon Warning Center. Tropical depressions that enter or form in the Philippine area of responsibility are assigned a name by the Philippine Atmospheric, Geophysical and Astronomical Services Administration or PAGASA. This can often result in the same storm having two names.

A total of 26 tropical cyclones formed this year in the Western Pacific, of which all became tropical storms. Of the 26, 10 storms reached typhoon intensity, of which 1 reached supertyphoon strength. Nine tropical cyclones moved through the Philippines this season, making this season the most active for the archipelago so far this decade.

Seasonal summary 

A total of 26 tropical cyclones formed this year in the Western Pacific, of which all became tropical storms. Of the 26, 10 storms reached typhoon intensity, of which 1 reached supertyphoon strength. Nine tropical cyclones moved through the Philippines this season.

Systems

Typhoon Roy (Asiang) 

Typhoon Roy, which crossed the open Western Pacific as a Category 4 typhoon in January, caused moderate to extensive damage across the Federated States of Micronesia and the Philippines, causing $23.5 million (1988 USD) but only one death.

Typhoon Susan (Biring) 

Typhoon Susan formed at the end of May just to the north of Luzon Island in the Philippines. As a depression Susan dropped heavy rains in and around the Manila area the resulting landslides killed 6 people. As Susan moved away from the Philippines the storm strengthened into a typhoon shortly before cross in the southern tip of Taiwan and turning extratropical just after passing Okinawa.

Tropical Storm 03W (Konsing) 

3W was a short lived tropical storm.

Typhoon Thad (Ditang) 

A tropical depression was designated by the JMA early on June 18. At the time, the depression was located south of the Caroline Islands. Further development was slow to occur due to strong winds aloft caused by a TUTT. Nevertheless, the system's cloud structure and outflow pattern slowly improved, and based on Dvorak estimates of T2.5/, the JTWC upgraded the disturbance into Tropical Storm Thad at 00:00 UTC on June 20, with the JMA following suit six hours later. After initially moving west, Thad tracked northwest due to the subtropical ridge to its north. Thad slowly deepened, with the JMA upgrading Thad to a severe tropical storm at 06:00 UTC on June 21 and a typhoon the next day. Additional strengthening did not occur, however, as the system developed a central cold over – a large irregular shaped area of deep convection. By June 23, Thad reached the western periphery of a subtropical ridge, and began to recurve in response to a mid-latitude trough over eastern China. Rapid weakening began at 00:00 UTC on June 24 due to increased winds aloft. The JTWC reported that Thad dissipated at 00:00 UTC on June 25, although the JMA continued to track it as a tropical depression for 12 more hours.

Severe Tropical Storm Vanessa (Edeng) 

Thunderstorm activity increased almost immediately thereafter, and the storm's outflow subsequently expanded, aided by a retreating Tropical Upper Tropospheric Trough (TUTT). The JMA upgraded the system into a tropical depression on the morning of June 26. Six hours later, the JTWC followed suit, and at 00:00 UTc on June 27, both the JTWC and JMA upgraded the depression into a tropical storm. Accelerating, Vanessa entered the South China Sea at 02:00 UTC on June 28. Strong wind shear then increased over the system, but Vanessa did not begin weakening until 00:00 UTC on June 29. Six hours later, after Vanessa became devoid of deep convection near the center, the JTWC issued their last warning on the system. However, the JMA continued to track it until noon that day.

Typhoon Warren (Huaning) 

A tropical depression formed to the east of Guam shortly before passing north of the island. Shortly after passing the island the storm strengthened into Tropical Storm Warren. Warren kept gathering strength and reached peak intensity of 130 mph while 300 miles east of Luzon Island. Typhoon Warren moved westward and brushed the extreme northern tip of Luzon Island in the Philippines causing $10 million in damage. Warren then made landfall near Shantou, China, 13,000 homes were destroyed and 17 people were killed in Guangdong Province.

Severe Tropical Storm Agnes 

Following the demise of Typhoon Warren, an area of disturbed weather formed southeast of Japan, and by July 27, this area had developed a closed surface circulation. At noon the same day, the JMA upgraded it into a tropical depression. Initially resembling a monsoon depression, the storm's upper-level outflow and organization increased on June 28 in response to decreased winds aloft. On June 29, both the JTWC and JMA upgraded the system into Tropical Storm Agnes. Contrary to forecasts, Agnes accelerated northeast in response to a trough northeast of Japan. Twelve hours later, the system lost all its deep convection, and the JTWC issued its last warning on it at 18:00 UTC. Despite this, the JMA continued to follow Agnes through August 4, three days after the agency declared Agnes extratropical.

JMA Tropical Storm Eight 

This was not tracked by the JTWC.

Tropical Storm Bill 

On August 1, the monsoon trough stretched from the Gulf of Tonkin to Japan, but four days later, abruptly re-aligned. This created favorable conditions aloft for tropical cyclone formation, and an area of convection in the Philippine Sea began to rapidly develop. On the evening of August 4, the JMA upgraded the disturbance into a tropical depression, and the next day, the JTWC issued a Tropical Cyclone Formation Alert (TCFA). However, its development rate slowed as the system separated from the monsoon trough. Tracking northeast, the low passed just southwest of the southern tip of Okinawa at 15:00 UTC on August 6. That day, the JMA upgraded the depression into a tropical storm, though the JTWC did not do the same until 24 hours later. Although the JTWC issued its final advisory at 00:00 UTC on August 8, with the JMA doing the same 36 hours later, its remains could still be identified through August 10.

Tropical Storm Bill, which formed on August 5 east of Taiwan, moved northwest to hit eastern China as a 45 mph tropical storm. Torrential rains and heavy flooding resulted in 110 casualties and widespread damage to roads and dams.

Tropical Storm Clara 

The disturbance was classified on August 5 by the JMA. The depression tracked westward under the influence of a subtropical ridge. Two days later, the system began to organize, although shower activity remained exposed from the center. Strong wind shear prevented further development, but by August 10, thunderstorm activity had increased in coverage. At 19:15 UTC the same day, the JTWC upgraded it to Tropical Storm Clara, with the JMA following suit around the same time. Due to a strengthening ridge, Kevin performed a counterclockwise loop, only to turn northeast on August 11. Shortly afterwards, shower activity quickly became displaced from the deep convection, prompting a weakening trend. The JTWC issued its final warning on August 12, though the JMA did not following suit until four days later.

JMA Tropical Storm Eleven 

This was not tracked by the JTWC.

Typhoon Doyle 

On August 12, an westward-moving area of disturbed weather developed within the monsoon trough. Deep convection developed near the low-level center on the next day, and the JMA classified the disturbance as a tropical depression. Overnight August 13 into August 14, the depression began to organize, and after performing a counterclockwise loop, it began moving to the west-northwest. At 18:00 UTC the same day, the JMA upgraded the depression into a tropical storm, though the JTWC did not follow suit until 18 hours later. Doyle then entered a period of rapid deepening, with the JMA upgrading Doyle into a typhoon on the morning of August 16. The typhoon then curved north as it rounded a subtropical ridge, although unlike most recurving tropical cyclones, a TUTT cell prevented. This change in forward motion led to a gradual weakening trend over cold water. On August 20, the JMA estimated that Doyle lost typhoon intensity, and two days later, downgraded it into a tropical depression. At this time, the system became devoid of deep convection prompted the JTWC to issue its final warning. The JMA estimated that Doyle became extratropical on August 25. The agency stopped following the extratropical remnants the next day.

Although the typhoon passed close to Wake Island near peak intensity, wind gusts only reached  and according to the JTWC, damage was insignificant.

JMA Tropical Storm Thirteen 

This was not tracked by the JTWC.

Tropical Storm Elsie 

On August 24, a persistent area of convection embedded in the monsoon trough was first detected. Despite favorable conditions aloft, the disturbance initially remained poorly organized. The JMA declared the system a tropical depression at 00:00 UTC on August 24, although the depression only started to organize on August 28. Dvorak classifications prompted the JTWC to upgrade the system into a tropical storm at midday, with the JMA following suit early on August 29. After tracking southeast, Elsie turned northeast. Interaction from newly formed Tropical Storm Fabian initially halted further intensification and the JTWC estimated that the storm was briefly no longer a classifiable tropical cyclone on August 30. The storm then accelerated to the northeast while becoming extratropical and at 18:00 the same day, the JTWC classified Elsie as extratropical, with the JMA doing the same on September 1.

Severe Tropical Storm Fabian 

Also on August 24, another area of disturbed weather was spotted within the monsoon trough, which was displaced from its normal position. Thunderstorm activity gradually improved in organization, and at 06:00 UTC on August 26, the JMA designated the system a tropical depression. The depression was upgraded into a tropical storm three days later by the JMA. Interaction with Elsie – the storms at one point were within  of each other – caused the cyclone to track eastward. Dvorak estimates of T3.0/ prompted the JTWC to upgrade it to a tropical storm on August 30, with the JMA upgrading it to a severe tropical storm that evening. Interaction with Elsie failed to stop Fabian from intensifying, and at 06:00 UTC on September 1, the JTWC upgraded Fabian into a typhoon, only for the storm to veer north shortly thereafter. On September 2, the JMA and the JTWC estimated that Fabian attained peak intensities of  respectively. Accelerating, Fabian began to encounter stronger westerly wind shear, which led to weakening. The JTWC declared Fabian an extratropical cyclone at 06:00 UTC on September 32, with the JMA doing the same on the next day.

Tropical Storm Gay 

The JMA upgraded the area into a tropical depression at 00:00 UTC on September 2. Surface observations of  along with Dvorak estimate of T2.5/ prompted a TCFA at 10:40 UTC, with the JTWC designating the system as Tropical Storm Gay the same evening. At 0:00 UTC on September 3 the JMA followed suit and upgraded Gay into a tropical storm. Moving northeastward, Gay quickly intensified, and on September 3, the JTWC and JMA estimated peak intensity of  respectively. Gay quickly weakened, however, due to strong wind shear. On September 4, the JTWC reported that Gay dissipated, although the JMA continued to track it as a weak tropical depression until September 7.

Typhoon Uleki 

Uleki had developed on August 28 well to the southeast of Hawai'i and become a hurricane in the north-central Pacific before crossing the International Date Line. At 00:00 UTC on September 8, the CPHC transferred warning responsibility of Uleki to the Joint Typhoon Warning Center (JTWC) and the storm was subsequently referred to as a typhoon. Three hours later Uleki made its closest approach to Midway Atoll, passing  to the south. Shortly thereafter the system crossed the International Date Line and the Japan Meteorological Agency (JMA) also began advising on the system. Uleki maintained this strength through September 10 as it continued on its west-northwest course. On that day, the typhoon again entered a region of weak steering currents between two anticyclones within the subtropical ridge. A trough approaching from the west was forecast to prompt Uleki to turn east; however, the typhoon maintained a general northwest motion in a stair-stepped fashion. Increasing wind shear and cooler air soon imparted weakening, and Uleki degraded to a tropical storm by September 12.

Continued effects from shear stripped the cyclone of all deep convection and by September 14 only a band of cirrus clouds remained in association with Uleki. The JTWC issued their final warning on the system at 00:00 UTC that day accordingly. The JMA maintained the system as a tropical depression as the former typhoon began turning to the east. Uleki later transitioned into an extratropical cyclone on September 16 as it accelerated to the east. The system dissipated the following day near the International Date Line, far from any major landmasses.

Typhoon Hal 

An area of disturbed weather developed to the west of Wake Island. Over the next two days, Hal slowly organized as it tracked westward, with both the JTWC and JMA declaring the disturbance a tropical depression on September 8 well to the southeast of Japan. Moving to the northwest, Hal intensified into a tropical storm on September 9, according to both the JTWC and JMA, and then turned to the southeast on September 10. The JTWC declared Hal a typhoon that day, with the JMA following suit the following day. Midday on September 11, Hal attained peak intensity. Early on September 12, Hal sharply recurved, first turning to the north-northwest and eventually northeast on September 15. Accelerating northeastward, Hal became an extratropical cyclone on September 17, and the JMA stopped tracking it the next day. As an extratropical cyclone, Hal restrengthened before moving through the eastern Bering Sea on September 19 and into Alaska on September 20. The weakening low moved on an anticyclonic path through southern Alaska before emerging into the Gulf of Alaska on September 23. The cyclone drifted erratically southward, dissipating in the Gulf of Alaska on September 25.

Severe Tropical Storm Irma 

Part of a mid-September tropical cyclone outbreak, Tropical Storm Irma originated from an area of disturbed weather developed on September 11. The same day, an increase in convection prompted the JTWC to issue a TCFA while the JMA upgraded it to a tropical depression. Aided by outflow from Typhoon Hal, Irma steadily deepened. Following Hal northward along a subtropical ridge, Irma slowly weakened, and later on September 15, the JTWC issued its last warning. A little over 24 hours later, the JMA ceased keeping an eye on Irma.

Tropical Storm Jeff (Lusing) 

A TUTT developed south of a subtropical ridge, which triggered inflow that later resulted in the development in an area of disturbed weather at 00:00 UTC on September 11. Six hours later, the JMA classified the disturbance as a tropical depression, and on September 13, the agency upgraded the depression into a tropical storm. Dvorak estimates of T2.5/ prompted the JTWC to follow suit the following morning. However, further organization was slow to occur due to strong wind shear caused by Jeff's proximity to Typhoon Hal; all deep convection was restricted to the southern semicircle. Late on September 15, the JTWC dropped warnings on Jeff. Just over 24 hours later, the JMA stopped tracking it as well.

Severe Tropical Storm Kit (Maring) 

A combination of increased convection, enhanced outflow aloft, and a Dvorak estimate of T2.0/ resulted in the JTWc upgraded the disturbance into a tropical depression; the JMA followed suit around this time. Even though the depression tracked westward over Luzon, the depression gradually intensified, and at 18:00 UTC on September 19, the JTWC upgraded Kit into a tropical storm. Eighteen hours later, the JMA did the same, making Kit the sixth out of eight tropical storm that month. Tracking over the open waters of the South China Sea, an expansion of the storm's southwesterly outflow channel promoted further intensification. On the morning of September 21, both the JTWC and JMA reported that Kit attained peak intensity of  respectively. Several hours later, the JMA ceased following the cyclone.

According to press reports, torrential rain occurred near Shantou, where Kit moved ashore. Eight people were killed and over one hundred were injured. About  of farmland were inundated. More than 24,000 houses were damaged and 759 houses collapsed. Forty boats, one bridge, and several river embankments were also damaged. The total damage in the area was estimated at a little over US$35.1 million. In Fujian Province, heavy rain due to the remnants of Kit and Mamie resulted in nine lives lost, with an addition 51,000 losing their homes. About  of farmland were inundated and over 1,200 houses were destroyed.

Severe Tropical Storm Lee (Ningning) 

On September 16, an area of disturbed weather spawned by a TUTT cell developed near the dateline. The disturbance traced westward over the next four days without organized appreciably, although the JMA did classify it as a tropical depression. Improved organization prompted the JTWC to issue a TCFA on September 20, and satellite intensity estimated led to the JTWC and JMA classifying the system as Tropical Storm Lee. On September 23, satellite images showed a partially exposed low-level center, which resulted in weakening. Although initially forecast by the JTWC to follow Kit into southern China. Instead, Lee recurved to the east of Okinawa. Lee transitioned to an extratropical cyclone on September 24 as it continued tracking northeastward.

Tropical Storm Mamie 

The second tropical cyclone of 1988 to develop in the South China Sea, Tropical Storm Mamie formed from the same extension of the monsoon trough that spawned Tropical Storm Kit. An area of disturbed weather developed on September 19. On the same day, the system was upgraded into a tropical depression by the JMA and due to a binary interaction with Kit, tracked southwestward. After veering east, the disturbance turned northeastward due to a trough. Increased wind shear took its toll, however, and September 23, the JTWC discontinued warnings on Mamie. However, the JMA did not downgrade Mamie into a tropical depression until 18:00 UTC that day, and did not stop tracking it altogether until September 25. The remnants of the storm later dissipated near Hong Kong. The remnants of the storm, combined with Tropical Storm Kit, later brought flooding to southern China. A total of nine people were killed by the floods.

Typhoon Nelson (Paring) 

Following a series of tropical cyclone outbreaks, there was a lull in tropical cyclone activity due to the presence of cold, dry air, which caused the monsoon trough to recede south to its climatological position. The disturbance slowly organized, and on September 30, the JMA upgraded the disturbance into a tropical depression. A dramatic increased in convection resulted in the issuance of a TCFA at 09:00 UTC on October 1. Later that day, both the JTWC and JMA upgraded the system into Tropical Storm Nelson. The newly named storm tracked westward towards the Philippine Islands, and then west-northwestward as it tracked along the periphery of the subtropical ridge. On October 2, the JTWC classified Nelson as a typhoon, and nine hours later, the typhoon began to clear out an eye. On October 3, the JMA upgraded Nelson to a typhoon. The storm subsequently entered a period of rapid deepening, and on October 4, the JTWC declared Nelson a super typhoon. The typhoon quickly lost deep convection, and on October 8, the JTWC issued its last warning on the system. The next day, the JMA declared Nelson extratropical, although its remnants were still identifiable for a couple more days.

JMA Tropical Storm Twenty-five 

Made landfall in Vietnam and was not monitored by the JTWC,

Typhoon Odessa (Seniang) 

Tracking west-northwest, the JMA upgraded the system into a tropical depression on October 9. The next day, the JTWC issued a TCFA. On October 11, the JMA upgraded the depression into a tropical storm, and twelve hours later, satellite intensity estimates prompted the JTWC to follow suit. Cool air aloft aided in intensification as Odessa tracked northwest, and midday on October 12, Odessa was upgraded into a typhoon by the JTWC. Despite forecasts of weakening, the JMA did the same and classified Odessa as a typhoon. A midget typhoon, Odessa continued to intensify, with the JTWC and JMA reporting a peak velocity of  respectively. Loss of organization followed a transition into an extratropical cyclone, and after the low-level circulation diverged from the deep convection, the JTWC issued the final warning on October 16. The JMA ceased watching the typhoon on October 19.

Severe Tropical Storm Pat (Toyang) 

Unlike most systems in 1988, Pat formed from an area of disturbed weather near 10th parallel north that was first noticed by the JTWC on October 16. At 03:00 UTC on October 18, a TCFA was issued. Initially, the system remained poorly organized, with almost all the convection located along the eastern semicircle. Thunderstorm activity associated with the system became more organized, and 15 hours later, the JMA declared it a tropical depression while the JTWC classified the disturbance as Tropical Storm Pat. The storm tracked westward due to a ridge to its north while gradually intensifying, and on October 19, Pat was upgraded into a tropical storm by the JMA. Following an improvement in Pat's substructure, the JTWC upgraded Pat to a typhoon on October 20. According to the JTWC, Pat crossed central Luzon while remaining a typhoon. Shortly thereafter, Pat began to weaken as it interacted with Hainan. The JTWC estimated that Pat weakened into a tropical storm over the Gulf of Tonkin, and later that day, dissipated slightly onshore Vietnam.

Across Hainan, transport and telephone services were disrupted. Overall, damage was estimated at US$16 million. In Hong Kong, the storm dropped heavy rainfall for four days. There, a man was killed when one of the containers crushed onto a truck. In another incident, a woman was killed after being hit by a falling flower pot. Elsewhere, a man was injured by a falling tree. Scaffoldings at a construction site collapsed, damaging two automobiles. Press reports also indicated that Pat and rainstorms associated with a low-pressure area in mid-October left at least 90 people killed and left 500.000 homeless in Vietnam.

Typhoon Ruby (Unsang) 

Typhoon Ruby, which developed east of the Philippines on October 20, rapidly intensified to a 145 mph typhoon while approaching central Luzon. It hit on the 24th, and rapidly weakened to a minimal typhoon over the island. Ruby, with its disrupted circulation, remained weak over the South China Sea, and land interaction with Vietnam caused it to dissipate on the 28th. Ruby caused over 300 fatalities, with widespread flooding and damage over its track. Ruby brought heavy rains and a 12-foot storm surge to Guam and the Marianas Islands. On Luzon, the storm's  winds caused tremendous damage to the town of Siniloan. In the Polillo Islands, east of Manila, Ruby spawned rare tornadoes that leveled homes. In the northern part of the Philippines, many fishing boats were wrecked by 30–40 foot waves, and 32 more people drowned. Damage in the Philippines totaled 5.64 billion Philippine Pesos (1989 pesos).

The passenger ferry the MV Doña Marilyn was in the Visayan Sea when the storm struck the vessel. The storm caused the ferry to list to the starboard until one of the decks was below the water, causing the ship to fill up rapidly. The passengers and crew tried to save the ship, but to no avail. The Doña Marilyn sank stern first taking 389 people with it. Only 147 people survived by clinging to life rafts.

Typhoon Skip (Yoning) 

Just 2 weeks after Ruby hit Luzon, Skip, which formed on November 3, hit the central Philippines as a 145 mph typhoon. Ruby reached the South China Sea on the 7th, and steadily weakened until dissipation on the 12th. Skip was responsible for killing 104 people (with 95 missing) and extensive damage to the coconut, rice, and sugar crops.

Severe Tropical Storm Tess (Welpring) 

After passing through the Philippines, a tropical disturbance organized in the South China Sea into a tropical depression late on the morning of November 4. Turning westward and strengthening, the cyclone became a tropical storm later that day, and then a typhoon by late November 5. It moved into Vietnam on November 6 and quickly weakened, becoming the only tropical cyclone that season to make landfall in the country. Its remains later moved across the Mekong River delta.

Tropical Storm Val (Apiang) 

The final tropical cyclone to develop in 1988 and the only in December, the origins of Tropical Storm Val. Tropical Storm Val was first spawned by an outbreak of Arctic air pushed southeastward across Asia on December 18. Within five days, this cold air mass extended from the southern Philippine Islands to the northern Marianas. The cold air quickly diminished, which spawned convection and multiple surface circulations across the monsoon trough. Thunderstorm activity consolidated on December 21, and an increase in organization prompted the issuance of a TCFA the next day. Later on December 22, both the JTWC and JMA upgraded the disturbance into a tropical depression. On December 24, the JMA upgraded the depression into Tropical Storm Val. The storm's center became less defined, which resulted in a weakening trend. After tracing northward, Val was downgraded to a tropical depression on December 27. The JTWC ceased tracking Val on December 26, with the JMA doing the same the next day.

Storm names 

During the season 26 named tropical cyclones developed in the Western Pacific and were named by the Joint Typhoon Warning Center, when it was determined that they had become tropical storms. These names were contributed to a revised list which started in 1979.

Philippines 

The Philippine Atmospheric, Geophysical and Astronomical Services Administration uses its own naming scheme for tropical cyclones in their area of responsibility. PAGASA assigns names to tropical depressions that form within their area of responsibility and any tropical cyclone that might move into their area of responsibility. Should the list of names for a given year prove to be insufficient, names are taken from an auxiliary list, the first 6 of which are published each year before the season starts. Names not retired from this list will be used again in the 1992 season. This is the same list used for the 1984 season. PAGASA uses its own naming scheme that starts in the Filipino alphabet, with names of Filipino female names ending with "ng" (A, B, K, D, etc.).

Retirement 
Because Typhoons Unsang and Yoning made extensive damage within the Philippines, the PAGASA later retired the names Unsang and Yoning and was replaced by Ulpiang and Yerling for the 1992 season.

Season effects 
This is a table of all of the storms that have formed in the 1987 Pacific typhoon season. It includes their duration, names, affected areas, damages, and death totals. Deaths in parentheses are additional and indirect (an example of an indirect death would be a traffic accident), but were still related to that storm. Damage and deaths include totals while the storm was extratropical, a wave, or a low, and all of the damage figures are in 1986 USD. Names listed in parentheses were assigned by PAGASA.

|-
| Roy (Asiang) ||  || bgcolor=#| || bgcolor=#| || bgcolor=#| || Marshall Islands, Mariana Islands, Caroline Islands, Philippines ||  ||  ||
|-
| Susan (Biring) ||  || bgcolor=#| || bgcolor=#| || bgcolor=#| || Philippines, Taiwan, Ryukyu Islands || None ||  ||
|-
| 03W (Konsing) ||  || bgcolor=#| || bgcolor=#| || bgcolor=#| || Philippines, Taiwan ||  None || None ||
|-
| Thad (Ditang) ||  || bgcolor=#| || bgcolor=#| || bgcolor=#| || Philippines || None || None ||
|-
| TD ||  || bgcolor=#| || bgcolor=#| || bgcolor=#| || None || None || None ||
|-
| Vanessa (Edeng) ||  || bgcolor=#| || bgcolor=#| || bgcolor=#| || Philippines, South China ||  None || None ||
|-
| Gloring ||  || bgcolor=#| || bgcolor=#| || bgcolor=#| || Taiwan || None || None ||
|-
| Warren (Huaning) ||  || bgcolor=#| || bgcolor=#| || bgcolor=#| || Mariana Islands, Caroline Islands, Philippines, Taiwan, China ||  ||  ||
|-
| TD ||  || bgcolor=#| || bgcolor=#| || bgcolor=#| || None || None || None ||
|-
| Agnes ||  || bgcolor=#| || bgcolor=#| || bgcolor=#| || None ||  None || None ||
|-
| TD ||  || bgcolor=#| || bgcolor=#| || bgcolor=#| || None || None || None ||
|-
| Eight ||  || bgcolor=#| || bgcolor=#| || bgcolor=#| || Japan ||  None || None ||
|-
| Isang ||  || bgcolor=#| || bgcolor=#| || bgcolor=#| || South China || None || None ||
|-
| TD ||  || bgcolor=#| || bgcolor=#| || bgcolor=#| || Ryukyu Islands || None || None ||
|-
| Bill (Isang) ||  || bgcolor=#| || bgcolor=#| || bgcolor=#| || Ryukyu Islands, East China ||  None ||  ||
|-
| Clara ||  || bgcolor=#| || bgcolor=#| || bgcolor=#| || None ||  None || None ||
|-
| TD ||  || bgcolor=#| || bgcolor=#| || bgcolor=#| || Japan || None || None ||
|-
| TD ||  || bgcolor=#| || bgcolor=#| || bgcolor=#| || None || None || None ||
|-
| TD ||  || bgcolor=#| || bgcolor=#| || bgcolor=#| || South China || None || None ||
|-
| TD ||  || bgcolor=#| || bgcolor=#| || bgcolor=#| || Japan || None || None ||
|-
| TD ||  || bgcolor=#| || bgcolor=#| || bgcolor=#| || Japan || None || None ||
|-
| Eleven ||  || bgcolor=#| || bgcolor=#| || bgcolor=#| || Japan, Soviet Union ||  None || None ||
|-
| Doyle ||  || bgcolor=#| || bgcolor=#| || bgcolor=#| || None || None || None ||
|-
| TD ||  || bgcolor=#| || bgcolor=#| || bgcolor=#| || Japan || None || None ||
|-
| Thirteen ||  || bgcolor=#| || bgcolor=#| || bgcolor=#| || Japan ||  None || None ||
|-
| TD ||  || bgcolor=#| || bgcolor=#| || bgcolor=#| || None || None || None ||
|-
| TD ||  || bgcolor=#| || bgcolor=#| || bgcolor=#| || None || None || None ||
|-
| Fabian ||  || bgcolor=#| || bgcolor=#| || bgcolor=#| || Japan ||  None || None ||
|-
| Elsie ||  || bgcolor=#| || bgcolor=#| || bgcolor=#| || None ||  None || None ||
|-
| Gay ||  || bgcolor=#| || bgcolor=#| || bgcolor=#| || None ||  None || None ||
|-
| TD ||  || bgcolor=#| || bgcolor=#| || bgcolor=#| || None || None || None ||
|-
| Uleki ||  || bgcolor=#| || bgcolor=#| || bgcolor=#| || Wake Island || None || None ||
|-
| Hal ||  || bgcolor=#| || bgcolor=#| || bgcolor=#| || Japan || None || None ||
|-
| TD ||  || bgcolor=#| || bgcolor=#| || bgcolor=#| || Japan || None || None ||
|-
| Irma ||  || bgcolor=#| || bgcolor=#| || bgcolor=#| || None ||  None || None ||
|-
| Jeff (Lusing) ||  || bgcolor=#| || bgcolor=#| || bgcolor=#| || None ||  None || None ||
|-
| Kit (Maring) ||  || bgcolor=#| || bgcolor=#| || bgcolor=#| || Philippines, South China ||  None ||  ||
|-
| Lee (Ningning) ||  || bgcolor=#| || bgcolor=#| || bgcolor=#| || Mariana Islands, Ryukyu Islands ||  None || None ||
|-
| Mamie ||  || bgcolor=#| || bgcolor=#| || bgcolor=#| || South China, Vietnam ||  None || None ||
|-
| TD ||  || bgcolor=#| || bgcolor=#| || bgcolor=#| || None || None || None ||
|-
| TD ||  || bgcolor=#| || bgcolor=#| || bgcolor=#| || Philippines, Vietnam, South China || None || None ||
|-
| Nelson (Paring) ||  || bgcolor=#| || bgcolor=#| || bgcolor=#| || Philippines, Japan || None || None ||
|-
| Osang ||  || bgcolor=#| || bgcolor=#| || bgcolor=#| || Philippines || None || None ||
|-
| TD ||  || bgcolor=#| || bgcolor=#| || bgcolor=#| || None || None || None ||
|-
| Twenty-five ||  || bgcolor=#| || bgcolor=#| || bgcolor=#| || Vietnam ||  None || None ||
|-
| Reming ||  || bgcolor=#| || bgcolor=#| || bgcolor=#| || Philippines ||  None || None ||
|-
| Odessa (Seniang) ||  || bgcolor=#| || bgcolor=#| || bgcolor=#| || Mariana Islands || None || None ||
|-
| TD ||  || bgcolor=#| || bgcolor=#| || bgcolor=#| || Vietnam, Cambodia, Thailand || None || None ||
|-
| Pat (Toyang) ||  || bgcolor=#| || bgcolor=#| || bgcolor=#| || Philippines, China, Vietnam ||  None || None ||
|-
| Ruby (Unsang) ||  || bgcolor=#| || bgcolor=#| || bgcolor=#| || Philippines, South China ||  ||  ||
|-
| Tess (Welpring) ||  || bgcolor=#| || bgcolor=#| || bgcolor=#| || Philippines, Vietnam ||  ||  ||
|-
| Skip (Yoning) ||  || bgcolor=#| || bgcolor=#| || bgcolor=#| || Philippines, Vietnam ||  ||  ||
|-
| TD ||  || bgcolor=#| || bgcolor=#| || bgcolor=#| || None || None || None ||
|-
| Val (Apiang) ||  || bgcolor=#| || bgcolor=#| || bgcolor=#| || Philippines ||  None || None ||
|-

See also 

 1988 Pacific hurricane season
 1988 Atlantic hurricane season
 1988 North Indian Ocean cyclone season
 South-West Indian Ocean cyclone seasons: 1987–88, 1988–89
 Australian region cyclone seasons: 1987–88, 1988–89
 South Pacific cyclone seasons: 1987–88, 1988–89

Notes

References

External links 
 Satellite movie of 1988 Pacific typhoon season
 Japan Meteorological Agency
 Joint Typhoon Warning Center .
 China Meteorological Agency
 National Weather Service Guam
 Hong Kong Observatory
 Macau Meteorological Geophysical Services
 Korea Meteorological Agency
 Philippine Atmospheric, Geophysical and Astronomical Services Administration
 Taiwan Central Weather Bureau

 
1988 WPAC